Rakul Vesturdal Magnussen (born 3 April 1988) is a Faroese footballer who plays as a midfielder for 1. deild kvinnur club EB/Streymur/Skála. She has been a member of the Faroe Islands women's national team.

References

1988 births
Living people
Women's association football midfielders
Faroese women's footballers
Faroe Islands women's international footballers